Trifluoromescaline (TF-M) is a derivative of the phenethylamine hallucinogen mescaline, which has a trifluoromethoxy group replacing the central methoxy group of mescaline. Synthesis of this compound was first reported by Daniel Trachsel in 2011, alongside many other related compounds. Trifluoromescaline was found to be one of the most potent compounds in the series, with a reported dosage of 15-40 mg (and 60 mg being described as a "strong overdose"), and a slow onset of action and long duration of effects, lasting 14-24 hours or more.

See also
 2C-TFM
 2C-TFE
 2C-T-28
 3C-DFE
 4-TM
 Allylescaline
 2-Bromomescaline

References

Psychedelic phenethylamines
Serotonin receptor agonists
Trifluoromethyl ethers